Higuera de la Serena is a municipality in the province of Badajoz, Extremadura, Spain. It has a population of 943 and an area of 71.1 km².

References

Municipalities in the Province of Badajoz